Carl "Cork" Hubbert (July 3, 1952 – September 28, 2003) was an American film and television actor.

Biography
Carl Hubbert was born on July 3, 1952 in Pendleton, Oregon. He is best known for the roles of Luther on the American television show The Charmings, Rollo Sweet in Under the Rainbow and Brown Tom in the Ridley Scott film Legend. He is also featured in the supporting cast of the 1985 Nancy Allen comedy Not for Publication. He also starred as Cousin Lymon in The Ballad of the Sad Café. Hubbert's struggles as an actor after Under the Rainbow and Magnum, P.I. were chronicled as part of The Sweeps: Behind the Scenes in Network TV, Mark Christensen and Cameron Stauth's book on NBC's 1983-1984 TV season.

Death
Hubbert died in 2003 in Venice, Los Angeles from complications of diabetes.

Filmography

References

External links 

Bio/overview
TV Acres
TV Guide
Turner Classic Movies

1952 births
2003 deaths
Male actors from Oregon
American male film actors
American male television actors
People from Pendleton, Oregon
Deaths from diabetes
20th-century American male actors
21st-century American male actors